Pârvu may refer to:

Pârvu Cantacuzino (died 1769), leader of an anti-Ottoman rebellion
Pârvu Mutu (1657–1735), Wallachian Romanian muralist and church painter
Florian Pârvu (born 1991), Romanian professional footballer
Florin Pârvu (born 1975), Romanian former football midfielder and current manager
Ionel Pârvu (born 1970), former Romanian football player
Lucian Pârvu (born 1982), Romanian former footballer

See also
Pârvu Roșu, a village near Costești, Argeș County, Muntenia, Romania